The Mercedes-Benz W114 and W115 were the internal designation Mercedes-Benz used for a generation of front-engine, rear-drive, five-passenger sedans and coupés introduced in 1968, with three-box styling by Paul Bracq — succeeding the W110 models introduced in 1961; and manufactured until model year 1976, when the W123 was released. 

W114/W115s were distinguished in the marketplace by nameplates relating to their engine size. W114 models featured six-cylinder engines and were marketed as the 230, 250, and 280.  W115 models featured four-cylinder engines and were marketed as the 200, 220, 230, and 240, with diesel models carrying a D designation, as distinct from gasoline/petrol models.

When Mercedes introduced the W114/115 in 1968, they marketed sedans in two size classes (W114/W115 and S-Class) and marketed the W114/115 range as New Generation Models, ultimately the only model of the new generation.  Mercedes used a '/8' on the W114/115 ID plates, indicating their 1968 launch year, giving rise to their '/8' or 'slash eight' nicknames — and the German nickname Strich Acht, loosely translated into English as stroke eight.

History

The W114/W115 models were the first post-war Mercedes-Benz production car to use a newly engineered suspension, not derived from preceding models. The new format of semi-trailing rear arms and ball-joint front end first displayed in the W114/W115 would be used in all new Mercedes passenger car models until the development of the multi-link rear suspensions of the 1980s.  The W108/109 S-Class of the 280S/8, 280SE/8 and 300SEL/8 (and W113 230SL, 250SL and 280SL "Pagoda") would be the last of the low-pivot swing axle and king pin/double wishbone front ends.  The next S-Class, the W116, had the same engineering as the W114/115.

The Mercedes-Benz W114/W115 was the mid-sized saloon model for Mercedes, positioned below the S-Class. Mercedes also launched its first 5-cylinder diesel engine OM617 in this chassis. It followed heavily in the direction set by the W108/109 S-class, which was launched in 1965 and heralded the new design idiom.  The car was designed by French auto designer Paul Bracq who was chief designer at Mercedes-Benz for models from 1957 to 1967, a period that included models such as the Grosser Mercedes-Benz 600. Bracq was also responsible for BMW designs (1970–74) and Peugeot designs (1974–96).

Mercedes introduced a coupé variant of the W114 in 1969, featuring a longer boot lid and available with either a 2.5 or 2.8 litre six-cylinder engine. While a classic and understated design these generally cost less than the W113-based 280 SL model that ran until 1971, and its successor, the 3.5 or 4.5 litre V8 Mercedes SL R107/C107 (1971–1989) roadster and coupé. While a 'hard-top' unlike the fully convertible SL, the pillarless design allowed all the windows to be lowered completely for open air motoring. Only 67,048 coupés were manufactured from 1969 to 1976 (vs. 1,852,008 saloons). Of these 24,669 were 280C and 280CE (top of the range), and 42,379 were the lesser 250C and 250CE (A Mercedes-Benz 220D pickup on the W115 chassis was produced briefly in Argentina in the 1970s.)

The W114 received a facelift in 1973 – with a lower bonnet-line, lower and broader grill, a single front bumper to replace the double bumpers, lower placement of the headlamps, A-pillar treatment for keeping the side windows clear, removal of the quarter-windows in the front doors, ribbed tail lights to minimize occlusion of the tail lights with road dirt, and larger side mirrors. The interior received inertia reel belts and a new padded steering wheel with a four-hole design.

The Mercedes-Benz W115 is known to be a very durable car.

Innovations

Like its larger variant, this car also boasted advanced technological innovations.  1969 saw the introduction of the Bosch D-jetronic fully electronic fuel injection system into the 250CE. This was the first ever production Mercedes-Benz to use this system.

Other innovations in the W114/W115 models include a center console (a first in a Mercedes saloon), ribbed taillights in 1974. All coupé models used the 6-cylinder engine (and thus were W114s) and were designated with a "C" in the model name.

North America

In 1968, Diesel-engined options were added to the W114/W115 line,  introduced in North America as the 220D, 240D and 300D.  These models from the start had unique headlights, utilizing a sealed-beam lamp instead of the H4 type used in the European models.  Bumpers changed frequently and there were at least three different bumpers used over the production run for the North American market. The 1974 model year brought significantly larger bumpers due to new DOT requirements.

North American 220Ds and 240Ds were offered with a 4-speed manual or 4-speed automatic, whereas all 5-cylinder 300D models were equipped with the 4-speed automatic without a manual option.

Models

W114

W115

W114 & W115 long-wheelbase models

See also 
 Mercedes-Benz W110
 Mercedes-Benz W123

References

Footnotes

Notes

Bibliography

General

Workshop manuals

External links

 Curbside Classic: 1970 Mercedes-Benz 220D – Ride In Teutonic Luxury (With 65 HP) – a retrospective of the W114
 Strich Acht Club Deutschland (in German)
 Mercedes Benz W114, W115 enthusiast Website and Forum (in English)
 Stroke Eight Site

W114
W114
Executive cars
Cars introduced in 1968
1970s cars
Limousines
Rear-wheel-drive vehicles
Coupés